Nanyue was an ancient kingdom that consisted of parts of the modern southern China and much of modern northern Vietnam.

Nanyue may also refer to:

Nanyue District, in Hengyang, Hunan, China
Mount Heng (Hunan), or Nan Yue, in Hunan, China
 Chinese for South Vietnam (南越)
 Nányuè, another name for Nanguan music